Robert Ernest Blackburn (23 April 1893 – 13 July 1964) was an English football player and manager.

Career

Playing career
Born in Crawshawbooth, Blackburn played as a full back for Loveclough, Manchester Youth Club, The Army, Aston Villa and Bradford City. For Aston Villa, he made 32 appearances in the Football League; he also made 1 FA Cup appearance. For Bradford City, he made 40 appearances in the Football League; he also made 2 FA Cup appearances.

Management career
After retiring as a player, Blackburn became a trainer at Accrington Stanley in May 1924. He later managed Wrexham, Hull City and Tranmere Rovers.

Sources

References

1893 births
1964 deaths
English footballers
English football managers
Aston Villa F.C. players
Bradford City A.F.C. players
English Football League players
Wrexham A.F.C. managers
Hull City A.F.C. managers
Tranmere Rovers F.C. managers
Association football fullbacks
People from Crawshawbooth